"A Case of You" is a song by Joni Mitchell, from her 1971 album Blue.

Writing and recording
Mitchell wrote "A Case of You" in or before 1970. As with many of the songs on her album Blue, it might have been inspired by her relationship with Graham Nash. It is also claimed that it is about Leonard Cohen. She performed the song at the Amchitka Greenpeace benefit concert in October 1970. She recorded the song in 1971, and it was released on the 1971 album Blue with Mitchell playing Appalachian dulcimer, accompanied by James Taylor on acoustic guitar, which was tuned to standard tuning, (EADGBE), although there are cover versions played in an open G tuning (DGDGBD).

Mitchell's earliest public performances of "A Case of You" contain six lines that had changed by the time Blue was recorded. The line "I am as constant as a northern star" is an allusion to Caesar's "I am constant as the Northern Star" from the Shakespeare play Julius Caesar, while the quoted line "Love is touching souls" is inspired by the German poet Rainer Maria Rilke.

"A Case of You" was also released as the B-side of "California".

Personnel
According to the liner notes:
 James Taylor – guitar
 Russ Kunkel – drums
 Joni Mitchell – production, Appalachian dulcimer, guitar, vocals
 Henry Lewy – engineer
 Gary Burden – art direction
 Tim Considine – cover photography

Additional recordings and performances
Mitchell later re-recorded the song for her live album Miles of Aisles (1974), as well as her orchestral album Both Sides Now (2000).

She performed it regularly on her 1983 tour.

The original recording was included on Mitchell's compilation Misses (1996).

A demo recording was included on the 50th anniversary EP of Blue in 2021.

Awards and accolades
In 2011, Mitchell was voted the No. 1 female artist and "A Case of You" the No. 1 female song by listeners of BBC Radio 4's Desert Island Discs.

In 2021, it was listed at No. 26 on Rolling Stone's "Top 500 Best Songs of All Time".

Cover versions

There are well over 300 known recordings of "A Case of You".

Tori Amos released a recording of the song on her 1994 single, Cornflake Girl.

Jane Monheit covered the song for her 2001 album Come Dream with Me.

Diana Krall covered the song on her 2001 album Live in Paris.

Prince covered the song on his 2002 album One Nite Alone....

The cabaret singer Connie Champagne recorded "A Case of You" in the persona of Judy Garland on her 2003 album Imagine Judy Garland: An Evening with Connie Champagne.

k.d. lang covered the song on her 2004 album Hymns of the 49th Parallel, a tribute to her favourite Canadian songwriters.

The English singer/songwriter James Blake covered Mitchell's song for his EP Enough Thunder (2011). Samples of the cover were then used in the tracks "Tep and the Logic" and "You Know Your Youth", which appeared on the deluxe edition of his eponymous debut album.

In 2012 the Portuguese singer Ana Moura recorded a cover version for her album Desfado produced by Mitchell's former husband and producer Larry Klein.

In 2013 James Wolpert performed "A Case of You" during the Live Playoffs of The Voice. His cover reached the Top 10 of the iTunes Top 200 Singles Chart. Other notable versions were performed by Rebekah Smarin (2014), Madi Davis (2015), Troy Ramey (2017), and Addison Agen (2017).

In 2014 English singer/songwriter Gabrielle Aplin recorded a cover version for her English Rain EP.

In 2021, actor Noah Reid performed a cover version of "A Case of You" in a video to honour his Schitt's Creek costar, Catherine O'Hara, who had received a Canadian Governor General's Award for excellence in the performing arts.

Soundtrack appearances
The song appears in the films Truly, Madly, Deeply, Practical Magic, Clickbait (cover) and Waking the Dead. Mitchell declined, however, to grant permission to use the song in the 2013 film A Case of You.

Truly, Madly, Deeply, writer-director Anthony Minghella's first film, marked the first appearance of "A Case of You" in a narrative film; the stars, Juliet Stevenson and Alan Rickman, sing the first verse and chorus of the song to each other, leading directly to the titular dialogue, "I truly, madly, deeply love you".

The song was both referenced and featured in a 1996 episode of the medical drama Chicago Hope, in which Dr. Diane Grad (Jayne Brook) mentions that Mitchell's Blue album was a personal favorite of hers while growing up, and that "A Case of You" was her favorite song on the album. Mitchell's recording of the song later played over the episode's closing credits.

In 2013 the song was featured in "In Dreams Begin Responsibilities", the fourth episode of the fifth season of NBC's Parenthood. One of the main characters, Drew, is pursuing a girl who mentions she loves the song. Drew tries to learn as much about Joni Mitchell as he can, only to find out that the girl only knows "A Case Of You" because it was in a movie.

References

1970 songs
Joni Mitchell songs
Songs written by Joni Mitchell
Prince (musician) songs
James Blake (musician) songs
Song recordings produced by Joni Mitchell